Symphyotrichum tradescantii (formerly Aster tradescantii) is a species of flowering plant in the family Asteraceae native to northeastern North America. Common names include Tradescant's aster and shore aster.

Description
Its flowers have white ray florets and pale yellow to purple disk florets.

Distribution and habitat

Native
Symphyotrichum tradescantii is native to northeastern North America in Canada (New Brunswick, Newfoundland, Nova Scotia, and Québec) and the United States (Maine, Massachusetts, New Hampshire, New Jersey, New York, Rhode Island, and Vermont).

Introduced
It is an introduced species in the Czech Republic, Slovakia, Slovenia, and Croatia.

Habitat
S. tradescantii is found in wet and rocky habitats such as shores, streams, and freshwater estuaries.

Citations

References

External links
Astereae Lab - University of Waterloo

tradescantii
Flora of Eastern Canada
Flora of the Northeastern United States
Plants described in 1753
Taxa named by Carl Linnaeus